Yavoriv Raion is a raion in Lviv Oblast in western Ukraine. Its administrative center is Yavoriv. It was established in 1939.

On 18 July 2020, as part of the administrative reform of Ukraine, the number of raions of Lviv Oblast was reduced to seven, and the area of Yavoriv Raion was significantly expanded. One abolished raion, Mostyska Raion, was merged into Yavoriv Raion. The January 2020 estimate of the raion population was

Subdivisions

Current
After the reform in July 2020, the raion consisted of 6 hromadas:
 Ivano-Frankove settlement hromada with the administration in the urban-type settlement of Ivano-Frankove, retained from Yavoriv Raion;
 Mostyska urban hromada with the administration in the city of Mostyska, transferred from Mostyska Raion;
 Novoiavorivsk urban hromada with the administration in the city of Novoiavorivsk, retained from Yavoriv Raion;
 Shehyni rural hromada with the administration in the selo of Shehyni, transferred from Mostyska Raion;
 Sudova Vyshnia urban hromada with the administration in the city of Sudova Vyshnia, transferred from Mostyska Raion;
 Yavoriv urban hromada with the administration in the city of Yavoriv, retained from Yavoriv Raion.

Before 2020

Before the 2020 reform, the raion consisted of three hromadas, 
 Ivano-Frankove settlement hromada with the administration in Ivano-Frankove ;
 Novoiavorivsk urban hromada with the administration in Novoiavorivsk;
 Yavoriv urban hromada with the administration in Yavoriv.

Demographics 
According to the 2001 Ukrainian census:

See also
 Administrative divisions of Lviv Oblast

References

External links
 javoriv-rda.gov.ua 

 
Raions of Lviv Oblast
1939 establishments in Ukraine